Hurll is a surname. Notable people with the surname include:

Estelle May Hurll (1863–1924), American aesthetic analyst
Fred Hurll (1905–1991), British scouting executive
Michael Hurll (1936–2012), British television producer